Cosmas and Damian (AD) were two Arab physicians and early Christian martyrs. They practised their profession in the seaport of Aegeae, then in the Roman province of Syria.

Cosmas and Damian were third century Arabian-born twin brothers who embraced Christianity and practised medicine and surgery without a fee. This led them to being named anargyroi (from the Greek , 'the silverless' or 'unmercenaries'); by this, they attracted many to the Christian faith. They reputedly cured blindness, fever, paralysis and reportedly expelled a breast serpent. They were arrested by Lysias, governor of Cilicia (modern day Çukurova, Turkey) during the Diocletian persecution because of their faith and fame as healers. Emperor Diocletian was a religious fanatic and favoured the pantheism of the Olympian Gods. He issued a series of edicts that condemned the Christians in his attempt to wipe out Christianity from his empire.

Lives

Nothing is known of their lives except that they suffered martyrdom in Syria during the persecution of the Emperor Diocletian. 
According to Christian traditions, the twin brothers were born in Arabia and became skilled doctors.

Saladino d'Ascoli, a 15th century Italian physician, claims that the medieval electuary, a pasty mass consisting of a drug mixed with sugar and water or honey suitable for oral administration, known as opopira, a complex compound medicine used to treat diverse maladies including paralysis, was invented by Cosmas and Damian.

During the persecution under Diocletian, Cosmas and Damian were arrested by order of the Prefect of Cilicia, one Lysias who is otherwise unknown, who ordered them under torture to recant. However, according to legend they stayed true to their faith, enduring being hung on a cross, stoned and shot by arrows and finally suffered execution by beheading. Anthimus, Leontius and Euprepius, their younger brothers, who were inseparable from them throughout life, shared in their martyrdom.

Veneration

The veneration of Cosmas and Damian quickly spread beyond Constantinople; accounts of their martyrdom were rewritten by various authors such as Andrew of Crete, Peter of Argos, Theodore II Laskaris, and a certain Maximus around 1300. The legends are preserved also in Syriac, Coptic, Georgian, Armenian, and Latin.

As early as the 4th century, churches dedicated to the twin saints were established at Jerusalem, in Egypt and in Mesopotamia. Devotion to the two saints spread rapidly in both East and West. Theodoret records the division of their reputed relics. Their relics, deemed miraculous, were buried in the city of Cyrrhus in Syria. Churches were built in their honor by Archbishop Proclus and by Emperor Justinian I (527–565), who sumptuously restored the city of Cyrrhus and dedicated it to the twins, but brought their purported relics to Constantinople; there, following his cure, ascribed to the intercession of Cosmas and Damian, Justinian, in gratitude also built and adorned their church at Constantinople, and it became a celebrated place of pilgrimage. At Rome, Pope Felix IV (526–530) rededicated the Library of Peace (Bibliotheca Pacis) as a basilica of Santi Cosma e Damiano in the Forum of Vespasian in their honour. The church is much rebuilt but still famed for its sixth-century mosaics illustrating the saints.

What are said to be their skulls are venerated in the Convent of Las Descalzas Reales of the Clares in Madrid, where they have been since 1581, the gift of Maria, daughter of Emperor Charles V. They had previously been removed from Rome to Bremen in the tenth century, and thence to Bamberg. 
Other skulls said to be theirs were discovered in 1334 by Burchard Grelle, Archbishop of Bremen. He "personally 'miraculously' retrieved the relics of the holy physicians Cosmas and Damian, which were allegedly immured and forgotten in the choir of the Bremen Cathedral. In celebration of the retrieval Archbishop and Chapter arranged a feast at Pentecost 1335, when the relics were translated from the wall to a more dignified place. Grelle claimed the relics were those Archbishop Adaldag brought from Rome in 965. The cathedral master-builder Johann Hemeling made a shrine for the relics, which was finished around 1420. The shrine, made from carved oak wood covered with gilt and rolled silver is considered an important mediaeval gold work. In 1649 Bremen's Chapter, Lutheran by this time, sold the shrine without the heads to Maximilian I of Bavaria. The two heads remained in Bremen and came into the possession of the small Roman Catholic community. They were shown from 1934 to 1968 in the Church of St. Johann and in 1994 they were buried in the crypt. The shrine is now shown in the Jesuit church of St Michael in Munich. At least since 1413 another supposed pair of skulls of the saints has been stored in St Stephens's Cathedral in Vienna. Other relics are claimed by the Church of San Giorgio Maggiore in Venice.

The martyr twins are invoked in the Canon of the Mass in the prayer known as the Communicantes (from the first Latin word of the prayer): "In communion with the whole Church, they venerate above all others the memory of the glorious ever-virgin Mary, Mother of our God and Lord, Jesus Christ, then of blessed Joseph, husband of the Virgin, your blessed Apostles and Martyrs, Peter and Paul, Andrew, James, ...John and Paul, Cosmas and Damian and all your Saints: grant through their merits and prayers that in all things we may be defended by the help of your protection." They are also invoked in the Litany of the Saints, and in the older form of the Roman rite, in the Collect for Thursday in the Third Week of Lent, as the station church for this day is Santi Cosma e Damiano.

Their feast day in the General Roman Calendar, which had been on 27 September, was moved in 1969 to 26 September because 27 September is the dies natalis ("day of birth" into Heaven) of Vincent de Paul, now more widely venerated in the Latin Church. In Canada it has been moved to 25 September (as 26 September is the Feast of the Canadian Martyrs in Canada).

Sts Cosmas and Damian are regarded as the patrons of physicians, surgeons, and pharmacists and are sometimes represented with medical emblems. They are also regarded as the patron saints of twins.

In Brazil, the twin saints are regarded as protectors of children, and 27 September is commemorated, especially in Rio de Janeiro, by giving children bags of candy with the saints' effigy printed on them and throughout the entire state of Bahia where Catholics and adepts of Candomblé religion offer typical food such as caruru.
The ritual consists of first offering the food to seven children that are no older than seven years old and then having them feast while sitting on the floor and eating with their hands. The Church of Saints Cosmas and Damian, in Igarassu, Pernambuco is Brazil's oldest church, built in 1535.

In the UK Damian is the dexter side supporter in the coat of arms of the British Dental Association.

Cosmas and Damian are venerated every year in Utica, New York at St. Anthony's Parish during the annual pilgrimage which takes place on the last weekend of September (close to the 27 September feast day). There are thousands of pilgrims who come to honor the saints. Over 80 busloads come from Canada and other destinations. The 2-day festival includes music (La Banda Rosa), much Italian food, masses and processions through the streets of East Utica. It is one of the largest festivals honoring saints in the northeast USA.

Eastern Christianity

In the Eastern Orthodox Church, Eastern Catholic Churches, and the Oriental Orthodox Churches, Cosmas and Damian are venerated as a type of saint known as Unmercenary Physicians (anargyroi, "without money"). This classification of saints is unique to the Eastern Church and refers to those who heal purely out of love for God and man, strictly observing the command of Jesus: "Freely have you received, freely give." («Δωρεὰν ἐλάβετε, δωρεὰν δότε...» ) While each of the Unmercenaries has his own feast days, all are commemorated together on the first Sunday in November, in a feast known as the Synaxis of the Unmercenary Physicians.

The Orthodox celebrate no less than three different sets of saints by the name of Cosmas and Damian, each with their own distinct feast day:

Saints Cosmas and Damian of Cilicia (Arabia) (17 October) Brothers, according to Christian legend they were beaten and beheaded together with three other Christians: Leontius, Anthimus, and Eutropius.
Saints Cosmas and Damian of Asia Minor — alternately, of Mesopotamia (1 November) Twin sons of Theodota of Philippi. Died peacefully and were buried together at Thereman in Mesopotamia.
Saints Cosmas and Damian of Rome (1 July) Brothers, according to Christian tradition they were martyred outside Rome by a jealous pagan physician during the reign of the Roman Emperor Carinus (283–284).

Orthodox icons of the saints depict them vested as laymen holding medicine boxes. Often each will also hold a spoon with which to dispense medicine. The handle of the spoon is normally shaped like a cross to indicate the importance of spiritual as well as physical healing, and that all cures come from God.

Churches

Australia
 St Mary & Sts Cozman and Demian Coptic Orthodox Church
 St Damians Catholic Church, Bundoora, Victoria
 Sts Anargiri, Greek Orthodox Church, Oakleigh, Victoria
 Agioi Anargiri Greek Orthodox Church, Sydney, New South Wales

Brazil
 Church of Saints Cosme and Damião, Igarassu, Pernambuco

Bulgaria
 Sandanski Monastery "Sveti Sveti Kozma i Damyan"
 Kuklen Monastery "Sveti Sveti Kozma i Damyan"
 Gigintsi Monastery "St.St. Bezsrebrenitsi Kosma and Damyan"
 Church of "St.St. Bezsrebrenitsi Kosma and Damyan", Sandanski
 Church of "St.St. Bezsrebrenitsi Kosma and Damyan", Svetovrachane
 Church of "St.St. Bezsrebrenitsi Kosma and Damyan", Plovdiv
 Church of "St.St. Bezsrebrenitsi Kosma and Damyan", Smolyan area
 Church of "St.St. Bezsrebrenitsi Kosma and Damyan", Belashtitsa
 Church of "St.St. Bezsrebrenitsi Kosma and Damyan", Krichim

Canada
 Church of Saint-Côme, Matawinie Regional County Municipality, Quebec
 Eglise St-Damien, Saint Damien, Quebec

Croatia
 Church of Saints Cosmas and Damian, Lastovo
 Church of Saints Cosmas and Damian, Kuzminec
 Sv. Kuzman i Damjan, Polaća

England

 Blean, Kent, church of St Cosmus  and St Damian
 Challock, Kent
 Keymer, Sussex,  St Cosmas and St Damian Church
 Sherrington, Wiltshire, church of St Cosmo  and St Damian
 Stretford, near Leominster, Herefordshire, church no longer in use and in the care of the Churches Conservation Trust
 Gospel Oak, north London, Greek Orthodox Church of St Cosmas and Damian (at 1 Gordon House Road, London NW5)

France
Saint Côme-Saint Damien church, Luzarches, Val d'Oise, France
Saint Côme-Saint Damien church, Paris, France
Saint Côme-Saint Damien church, Chamboulive, France
Saint Côme-Saint Damien church, Serdinya, France

Germany
Essen Cathedral, Essen

Goa

Igreja dos Santos Cosme e Damião, Bogmalo

Greece
 10th century chapel of Agioi Anargyroi in the town of Servia.
 11th century church in the city of Kastoria.

Hungary
Szent Kozma és Damján templom, Vát, Hungary

Italy
 Basilica of Santi Cosma e Damiano, I Santi Medici, Bitonto, Bari, Italy
 Sanctuary of San Cosimo alla Macchia in Oria, Apulia, Italy
Santi Cosma e Damiano
Chiesa Matrice-Basilica minore Pontificia dal venerdì 18 febbraio 2000-Santuario dal lunedì 12 settembre 1938-Parrocchia dal mercoledì 16 marzo e martedì 19 aprile 1814 dei Santi Medici e Martiri Cosma e Damiano;  Alberobello, Puglia, Italy

Kenya
Orthodox Cathedral of Saints Anargyroi, Nairobi

North Macedonia
Sv. Kuzman i Damjan Ohrid
Sv. Kuzman i Damjan Jedoarce, Tetovo
Sv. Kuzman i Damjan Govrlevo, Skopje
Sv. Kuzman i Damjan Triangla, Skopje
Sv. Kuzman i Damjan Bolnicka Crkva, Veles (Sveti Besrebrenici Kozma i Damjan)

Mexico
Saint Cosmas and Damian Church, Mazatecochco, Tlaxcala
Saint Cosmas and Damian Church, Xaloztoc, Tlaxcala
Saint Cosmas and Damian Church, San Damián Texoloc, Tlaxcala
San Cosme y Damián Church, Villa de Cos, Zacatecas

Paraguay
 Misión jesuítica de San Cosme y Damián

Russia
 Church of Cosmas and Damian, Novgorod

Serbia
 Church of Saints Cosmas and Damian, Ivanjica
Zočište Monastery, Kosovo

Slovakia
 Kostol sv. Kozmu a Damiána, Bratislava - Dúbravka
 Kostol sv. Kozmu a Damiána, Trenčín - Biskupice
 Kostol sv. Kozmu a Damiána, Kšinná

United States
 Chapel of San Cosme y Damián, Tucson, Arizona
 Ss. Cosmas & Damian Church, Punxsutawney, Pennsylvania
 Chapel of Saint Cosmas & Damiano; Utica, NY
 Chapel of Saint Cosmas & Damian; Flushing, NY
 Saints Cosmas and Damian Society, Cambridge, MA
 Saint Cosmas & Damiano Society of St. Anthony & St. Agnes Church, Utica N.Y. 
 Saint Damian, Oak Forest, IL
 Ss. Cosmas & Damian Church, Twinsburg, Ohio
 Ss. Cosmas & Damian Church, Conshohocken, PA (closed 2014)
 Sts. Anargyroi Greek Orthodox Church, Marlborough, MA

See also
 Saints Cosmas and Damian, patron saint archive

References

Further reading
Acta Sanctorum, 27 Sept, p 432 para 187 O pana

External links 
 
Catholic Encyclopedia:Sts. Cosmas and Damia
Leslie G. Matthews, "SS. Cosmas and Damian—Patron Saints of Medicine and Pharmacy: Their Cult in England" in Medical History: notes on the few English churches dedicated to these saints
Wonderworkers and Unmercenaries Cosmas and Damian of Asia Minor (1 November) Eastern Orthodox icon and synaxarion
Holy Wonderworking Unmercenary Physicians Cosmas and Damian at Rome (1 July)
Martyrs and Unmercenaries Cosmas Damian in Cilicia (17 October)
Synaxis of the Holy Unmercenaries Icon
Representations of Saints Cosmas and Damian
Saints Cosmas and Damian at the Christian Iconography web site
"Here Follow the Lives of Saints Cosmo and Damian" from the Caxton translation of the Golden Legend
The Feast of Saints Cosmas and Damian, Cambridge, MA
Colonnade Statue St Peter's Square
Domkirche Ss. Cosmas und Damian und der heiligen Jungfrau Maria, Essen

3rd-century births
287 deaths
3rd-century Christian martyrs
3rd-century Roman physicians
Saints duos
Groups of Roman Catholic saints
Syrian Christian saints
Twins from ancient Rome
Holy Unmercenaries
Miracle workers
Arabs in the Roman Empire
Arab Christian saints
3rd-century Arabs
Brother duos
Christians martyred during the reign of Diocletian